The 8th Biathlon European Championships were held in Maurienne, France, from January 24 to January 28, 2001.

There were total of 16 competitions held: sprint, pursuit, individual and relay both for U26 and U21.

Results

U26

Men's

Women's

U21

Men's

Women's

Medal table

External links 
 IBU full results
 All results

Biathlon European Championships
International sports competitions hosted by France
European Championships
Biathlon European Championships
Biathlon European Championships
Biathlon competitions in France